Åsane Church is a parish church of the Church of Norway in Bergen Municipality in Vestland county, Norway. It is located in the borough of Åsane in the city of Bergen. It is the church for the Åsane parish which is part of the Åsane prosti (deanery) in the Diocese of Bjørgvin. The large, red, brick church was built in a circular design in 1993 using plans drawn up by the architect Trygve Dyngeland. The church seats about 600 people. The church was built to replace the Old Åsane Church which had recently had a large fire.

History
On Christmas Eve 1992, the Åsane Church burned down because of arson. This unfortunate incident sped up plans for building a new, larger church for Åsane to replace the old stone church from 1795. The new building was designed by Trygve Dyngeland in the architectural firm Aall, Løkeland and Ragde. The new church was designed to be much larger than the old church. The main nave of the church was to hold about 350 people (about 100 more people than the old church). There would also be adjoining rooms with movable walls, so the seating can expand up to about 600 people as needed. The new church is also more functional that the previous church with a kitchen, office space, a fellowship hall, not to mention the addition of bathroom facilities which were not available in the old church. The basement of the church can fit up to 400 people for other social gatherings. This new church was consecrated on 19 December 1993, a few days before the one-year anniversary of the fire in the old Åsane Church. After the new church was completed, the old church was rebuilt using the stone walls and foundations that survived the fire.

Media gallery

See also
List of churches in Bjørgvin

References

Churches in Bergen
Brick churches in Norway
Fan-shaped churches in Norway
20th-century Church of Norway church buildings
Churches completed in 1993
1993 establishments in Norway